Over the Edge is the second studio album by heavy metal band Hurricane. It was released in 1988 on Enigma Records. The album peaked at number 92 on the Billboard Top Pop Albums chart.

Track listing
All of the following songs have been written by Hurricane, except where noted:

 "Over the Edge" – 5:35 
 "I'm Eighteen" (Alice Cooper, Michael Bruce, Glen Buxton, Dennis Dunaway, Neal Smith ) – 4:15 
 "I'm on to You" (Jeff Jones) – 3:56 
 "Messin' with a Hurricane" – 5:02
 "Insane" – 3:48 
 "We Are Strong" – 4:41 
 "Spark in My Heart" – 4:56 
 "Give Me an Inch" – 4:17
 "Shout" – 4:46
 "Baby Snakes" – 4:30

Credits
Kelly Hansen – vocals, guitars
Jay Schellen – drums, percussion and vocals
Robert Sarzo – guitars and vocals
Tony Cavazo – bass guitar and vocals

+ On certain editions of the album, Kelly Hansen is credited as having performed additional guitar and keyboards as well. Furthermore, in the album's liner notes, where the band members' endorsements for their respective instruments are listed, "B.C. Rich Guitars" appears under Hansen's name.

Production
Engineers – Mike Clink, Chris Steinmetz and Garth Richardson

References

Hurricane (band) albums
1988 albums
Enigma Records albums